The Central Committee (CC) composition was elected by the 10th Congress, and sat from 16 March 1921 until 2 April 1922. The CC 1st Plenary Session renewed the composition of the Politburo, Secretariat and the Organizational Bureau (OB) of the Russian Communist Party (Bolsheviks).

Plenums
The CC was not a permanent institution. It convened plenary sessions, of which nine CC plenary sessions and one joint CC–Central Control Commission (CCC) plenary sessions were held between the 10th Congress and the 11th Congress. When the CC was not in session, decision-making powers were transferred to inner bodies of the CC itself; the Politburo, Secretariat and Orgburo (none of these bodies were permanent either, but convened several times a months).

Apparatus
Individuals employed by Central Committee's bureaus, departments and newspapers made up the apparatus between the 10th Congress and the 11th Congress. The bureaus and departments were supervised by the Secretariat, and each secretary (member of the Secretariat) supervised a specific department. The leaders of departments were officially referred to as Heads, while the titles of bureau leaders varied between chairman, first secretary and secretary.

Composition

Members

Candidates

References

General

Plenary sessions, apparatus heads, ethnicity (by clicking on the individual names on "The Central Committee, elected X th Congress of the RCP (B) 16/3/1921 members" reference), the Central Committee full- and candidate membership, Politburo membership, Secretariat membership and Orgburo membership were taken from these sources:

Bibliography

Sources

Central Committee of the Communist Party of the Soviet Union
1921 establishments in Russia
1922 disestablishments in Russia
1921 in politics
1922 in politics
1921 in Russia
1922 in Russia